Mongolian is the official language of Mongolia and both the most widely spoken and best-known member of the Mongolic language family. The number of speakers across all its dialects may be 5.2 million, including the vast majority of the residents of Mongolia and many of the ethnic Mongol residents of the Inner Mongolia Autonomous Region of the People's Republic of China. In Mongolia, Khalkha Mongolian is predominant, and is currently written in both Cyrillic and the traditional Mongolian script. In Inner Mongolia, it is dialectally more diverse and written in the traditional Mongolian script. However, Mongols in both countries often use the Latin script for convenience on the Internet.

In the discussion of grammar to follow, the variety of Mongolian treated is the standard written Khalkha formalized in the writing conventions and in grammar as taught in schools, but much of it is also valid for vernacular (spoken) Khalkha and other Mongolian dialects, especially Chakhar Mongolian.

Some classify several other Mongolic languages like Buryat and Oirat as varieties of Mongolian, but this classification is not in line with the current international standard.

Mongolian is a language with vowel harmony and a complex syllabic structure compared to other Mongolic languages, allowing clusters of up to three consonants syllable-finally. It is a typical agglutinative language that relies on suffix chains in the verbal and nominal domains. While there is a basic word order, subject–object–predicate, ordering among noun phrases is relatively free, as grammatical roles are indicated by a system of about eight grammatical cases. There are five voices. Verbs are marked for voice, aspect, tense and epistemic modality/evidentiality. In sentence linking, a special role is played by converbs.

Modern Mongolian evolved from Middle Mongol, the language spoken in the Mongol Empire of the 13th and 14th centuries. In the transition, a major shift in the vowel-harmony paradigm occurred, long vowels developed, the case system changed slightly, and the verbal system was restructured. Mongolian is related to the extinct Khitan language. It was believed that Mongolian was related to Turkic, Tungusic, Korean and Japonic languages but this view is now seen as obsolete by a majority of (but not all) comparative linguists. These languages have been grouped under the Altaic language family and contrasted with the Mainland Southeast Asia linguistic area. However, instead of a common genetic origin, Clauson, Doerfer, and Shcherbak proposed that Turkic, Mongolic and Tungusic languages form a language Sprachbund, rather than common origin. Mongolian literature is well attested in written form from the 13th century but has earlier Mongolic precursors in the literature of the Khitan and other Xianbei peoples. The Bugut inscription dated to 584 CE and the Inscription of Hüis Tolgoi dated to 604–620 CE appear to be the oldest substantial Mongolic or Para-Mongolic texts discovered.

Geographic distribution 
Mongolian is the official national language of Mongolia, where it is spoken (but not always written) by nearly 3.6 million people (2014 estimate), and the official provincial language (both spoken and written forms) of Inner Mongolia, China, where there are at least 4.1 million ethnic Mongols. Across the whole of China, the language is spoken by roughly half of the country's 5.8 million ethnic Mongols (2005 estimate) However, the exact number of Mongolian speakers in China is unknown, as there is no data available on the language proficiency of that country's citizens. The use of Mongolian in Inner Mongolia, has witnessed periods of decline and revival over the last few hundred years. The language experienced a decline during the late Qing period, a revival between 1947 and 1965, a second decline between 1966 and 1976, a second revival between 1977 and 1992, and a third decline between 1995 and 2012. However, in spite of the decline of the Mongolian language in some of Inner Mongolia's urban areas and educational spheres, the ethnic identity of the urbanized Chinese-speaking Mongols is most likely going to survive due to the presence of urban ethnic communities. The multilingual situation in Inner Mongolia does not appear to obstruct efforts by ethnic Mongols to preserve their language. Although an unknown number of Mongols in China, such as the Tumets, may have completely or partially lost the ability to speak their language, they are still registered as ethnic Mongols and continue to identify themselves as ethnic Mongols. The children of inter-ethnic Mongol-Chinese marriages also claim to be and are registered as ethnic Mongols so they can benefit from the preferential policies for minorities in education, healthcare, family planning, school admissions, the hiring and promotion, the financing and taxation of businesses, and regional infrastructural support given to ethnic minorities in China. In 2020, the Chinese government required three subjects — language and literature, politics, and history — to be taught in Mandarin in Mongolian-language primary and secondary schools in the Inner Mongolia since September, which caused widespread protests among ethnic Mongol communities. These protests were quickly suppressed by the Chinese government.

Classification and dialects 

Mongolian belongs to the Mongolic languages. The delimitation of the Mongolian language within Mongolic is a much disputed theoretical problem, one whose resolution is impeded by the fact that existing data for the major varieties is not easily arrangeable according to a common set of linguistic criteria. Such data might account for the historical development of the Mongolian dialect continuum, as well as for its sociolinguistic qualities. Though phonological and lexical studies are comparatively well developed, the basis has yet to be laid for a comparative morphosyntactic study, for example between such highly diverse varieties as Khalkha and Khorchin.

The status of certain varieties in the Mongolic group—whether they are languages distinct from Mongolian or just dialects of it—is disputed. There are at least three such varieties: Oirat (including the Kalmyk variety) and Buryat, both of which are spoken in Russia, Mongolia, and China; and Ordos, spoken around Inner Mongolia's Ordos City.

There is no disagreement that the Khalkha dialect of the Mongolian state is Mongolian. Beyond this point, however, agreement ends. For example, the influential classification of Sanžeev (1953) proposed a "Mongolian language" consisting of just the three dialects Khalkha, Chakhar, and Ordos, with Buryat and Oirat judged to be independent languages.

On the other hand, Luvsanvandan (1959) proposed a much broader "Mongolian language" consisting of a Central dialect (Khalkha, Chakhar, Ordos), an Eastern dialect (Kharchin, Khorchin), a Western dialect (Oirat, Kalmyk), and a Northern dialect (consisting of two Buryat varieties). Additionally, the Language Policy in the People’s Republic of China: Theory and Practice Since 1949, states that Mongolian can be classified into four dialects: the Khalkha dialect in the middle, the Horcin-Haracin dialect in the East, Oriat-Hilimag in the west, and Bargu-Buriyad in the north.

Some Western scholars propose that the relatively well researched Ordos variety is an independent language due to its conservative syllable structure and phoneme inventory. While the placement of a variety like Alasha, which is under the cultural influence of Inner Mongolia but historically tied to Oirat, and of other border varieties like Darkhad would very likely remain problematic in any classification, the central problem remains the question of how to classify Chakhar, Khalkha, and Khorchin in relation to each other and in relation to Buryat and Oirat. The split of  into  before *i and  before all other reconstructed vowels, which is found in Mongolia but not in Inner Mongolia, is often cited as a fundamental distinction, for example Proto-Mongolic , Khalkha , Chakhar  'year' versus Proto-Mongolic , Khalkha , Chakhar  'few'. On the other hand, the split between the past tense verbal suffixes - in the Central varieties v. - in the Eastern varieties is usually seen as a merely stochastic difference.

In Inner Mongolia, official language policy divides the Mongolian language into three dialects: Southern Mongolian, Oirat, and Barghu-Buryat. Southern Mongolian is said to consist of Chakhar, Ordos, Baarin, Khorchin, Kharchin, and Alasha. The authorities have synthesized a literary standard for Mongolian in whose grammar is said to be based on Southern Mongolian and whose pronunciation is based on the Chakhar dialect as spoken in the Plain Blue Banner. Dialectologically, however, western Southern Mongolian dialects are closer to Khalkha than they are to eastern Southern Mongolian dialects: e.g. Chakhar is closer to Khalkha than to Khorchin.

Besides Mongolian, or "Central Mongolic", other languages in the Mongolic grouping include Dagur, spoken in eastern Inner Mongolia, Heilongjiang, and in the vicinity of Tacheng in Xinjiang; the Shirongolic subgroup Shira Yugur, Bonan, Dongxiang, Monguor, and Kangjia, spoken in Qinghai and Gansu regions; and the possibly extinct Moghol of Afghanistan.

As for the classification of the Mongolic family relative to other languages, the Altaic theory (which is increasingly less well received among linguists) proposes that the Mongolic family is a member of a larger Altaic family that would also include the Turkic and Tungusic, and usually Koreanic languages and Japonic languages as well.

List of dialects 
Juha Janhunen (2003: 179) lists the following Mongol dialects, most of which are spoken in Inner Mongolia.
Tongliao group
Horchin
Jasagtu
Jarut
Jalait
Dörbet
Gorlos
Juu Uda group
Aru Horchin
Baarin
Ongniut
Naiman
Aohan
Josotu group
Harachin
Tümet
Ulan cab group
Cahar
Urat
Darhan
Muumingan
Dörben Küüket
Keshigten
Shilingol group
Üdzümüchin
Huuchit
Abaga
Abaganar
Sönit
Outer Mongolian group
Halh
Hotogoit
Darhad
Congol
Sartul
Dariganga

Juha Janhunen (2012) 
In Juha Janhunen's book titled "Mongolian", he groups the Mongolic language family into 4 distinct linguistic branches:

 the Dagur branch, made up of just the Dagur language, which is spoken in the northeast area of Manchuria in China, specifically in Morin Dawa Daur Autonomous Banner of Hulunbuir, and in Meilisi Daur District of Qiqihar, Heilongjiang.
 the Moghol branch, made up of just the Moghol language, spoken in Afghanistan, and is possibly extinct.
 the Shirongolic (or Southern Mongolic) branch, made up of roughly 7 languages, and which are spoken in the Amdo region of Tibet.
 the Common Mongolic (or Central Mongolic) branch, made up of roughly 6 languages, and which are spoken centrally in the country of Mongolia, as well as Manchuria and Inner Mongolia to the east, Ordos to the south, Dzungaria to the west, and Siberia to the north.

Shirongolic 
The Shirongolic branch of the Mongolic languages, part of a Gansu–Qinghai Sprachbund, is made up of roughly 7 languages, grouped in the following way:

 Shira Yughur
 Monguor group
 Mongghul
 Mongghuor
 Mangghuer
 Bonan group
 Bonan
 Kangjia
 Santa

Common Mongolic 
The Common Mongolic (or Central Mongolic) branch of the Mongolic languages is made up of roughly 6 languages, grouped in the following way:

 Khalkha is spoken in Mongolia, but some dialects (e.g. Cahar) is also spoken in the Inner Mongolia region of China.
 Khorchin is spoken to the east in eastern Inner Mongolia and Manchuria.
 Ordos is spoken to the south, in Ordos City in Inner Mongolia.
 Oirat, is spoken to the west, in Dzungaria.
 Khamnigan is spoken in northeast Mongolia and in northwest of Manchuria.
 Buryat is spoken to the north, in the Republic of Buryatia of Russia, as well as in the Barga region of Hulun Buir League in Inner Mongolia.

Phonology 

The following description is based primarily on the Khalkha dialect as spoken in Ulaanbaatar, Mongolia's capital. The phonologies of other varieties such as Ordos, Khorchin, and even Chakhar, differ considerably. This section discusses the phonology of Khalkha Mongolian with subsections on Vowels, Consonants, Phonotactics and Stress.

Vowels 
The standard language has seven monophthong vowel phonemes. They are aligned into three vowel harmony groups by a parameter called ATR (advanced tongue root); the groups are −ATR, +ATR, and neutral. This alignment seems to have superseded an alignment according to oral backness. However, some scholars still describe Mongolian as being characterized by a distinction between front vowels and back vowels, and the front vowel spellings 'ö' and 'ü' are still often used in the West to indicate two vowels which were historically front. The Mongolian vowel system also has rounding harmony.

Length is phonemic for vowels, and each of the seven phonemes occurs short or long. Phonetically, short  has become centralized to the central vowel .

In the following table, the seven vowel phonemes, with their length variants, are arranged and described phonetically. The vowels in the Mongolian Cyrillic alphabet are: 
{| class="wikitable"
|+
!Mongolian Cyrillic
!IPA
!Romanization
|-
|а, аа
|[a, aː]
|a, aa
|-
|и, ий/ы
|[i, iː]
|i, ii
|-
|о, оо
|[ɔ, ɔː]
|o, oo
|-
|ө, өө
|[ɵ, oː] /o, oː/
|ö, öö
|-
|у, уу
|[ʊ, ʊː]
|u, uu
|-
|ү, үү
|[u, uː]
|ü, üü
|-
|э, ээ
|[e, eː]
|e, ee
|}
{| class="wikitable" style="text-align: center;"
!
! colspan="2" |Front
! colspan="2" |Central
! colspan="2" |Back
|-
!
! Short
! Long
! Short
! Long
! Short
! Long
|-
! style="text-align: left;" |Close
|
|
|
|
|
|
|-
! style="text-align: left;" |Near-Close
|
|
|
|
|
|
|-
! style="text-align: left;" |Close-Mid
|
|
|
|
|
|
|-
! style="text-align: left;" |Open-mid
|
|
|
|
|
|
|-
! style="text-align: left;" |Open
|
|
|
|
|
|
|}

Khalkha also has four diphthongs: historically  but are pronounced more like ; e.g. ой in   'dog', ай in   sea', уй in   'to cry', үй in   'factory', эй in   'necessary'. There are three additional rising diphthongs  (иа),  (уа)  (эй); e.g. иа in   'individually', уа in   'barracks'.

Allophones 
This table below lists vowel allophones (note that short vowels allophones in non-initial positions are used interchangeably with schwa):

ATR harmony 
Mongolian divides vowels into three groups in a system of vowel harmony:

{| class="wikitable" style="text-align: center;"
!
! +ATR ("front")
! −ATR ("back")
! Neutral
|-
|IPA
| 
| 
|
|-
|Cyrillic
|э, ү, ө
|а, у, о
|и, ы and й
|}

For historical reasons, these have been traditionally labeled as "front" vowels and "back" vowels. However, for modern Mongolian phonology, it is more appropriate to instead characterize the two vowel-harmony groups by the dimension of tongue root position. There is also one neutral vowel, not belonging to either group.

All the vowels in a noncompound word, including all its suffixes, must belong to the same group. If the first vowel is −ATR, then every vowel of the word must be either  or a −ATR vowel. Likewise, if the first vowel is a +ATR vowel, then every vowel of the word must be either  or a +ATR vowel. In the case of suffixes, which must change their vowels to conform to different words, two patterns predominate.

 'household' +  (instrumental) →  'by a household'
 'sentry' +  (instrumental) →  'by a sentry'

 'to take"l' +  (causative) → 

Rounding harmony 
Mongolian also has rounding harmony, which does not apply to close vowels. 'came in', but  'inserted'.

Vowel length 
The pronunciation of long and short vowels depends on the syllable's position in the word. In word-initial syllables, there is a phonemic contrast in vowel length. A long vowel has about 208% the length of a short vowel. In word-medial and word-final syllables, formerly long vowels are now only 127% as long as short vowels in initial syllables, but they are still distinct from initial-syllable short vowels. Short vowels in noninitial syllables differ from short vowels in initial syllables by being only 71% as long and by being centralized in articulation. As they are nonphonemic, their position is determined according to phonotactic requirements.

Consonants 
The following table lists the consonants of Khalkha Mongolian. The consonants enclosed in parentheses occur only in loanwords.

A rare feature among the world's languages, Mongolian lacks the voiced lateral approximant,  and the voiceless velar plosive ; instead, it has a voiced alveolar lateral fricative, which is often realized as voiceless . The occurrence of palatalized consonant phonemes seems to be restricted to words that contain [−ATR] vowels. Aspirated consonants are preaspirated in medial and word-final contexts, devoicing preceding consonants and vowels. Devoiced short vowels are often deleted.

Syllable structure and phonotactics 
The maximal syllable is CVVCCC, where the last C is a word-final suffix. A single short vowel rarely appears in syllable-final position. For two-consonant clusters, the following restrictions obtain:

  may precede only  and 
  does not seem to appear in second position

Clusters that do not conform to these restrictions will be broken up by an epenthetic nonphonemic vowel in a syllabification that takes place from right to left. For instance,  'two',  'work', and  'neutral' are, phonemically, and  respectively. In such cases, an epenthetic vowel is inserted to prevent disallowed consonant clusters. The phonetic form of the epenthetic vowel follows from vowel harmony triggered by the vowel in the preceding syllable.

Stress 
Stress in Mongolian is nonphonemic (does not distinguish different meanings) and thus is considered to depend entirely on syllable structure. But scholarly opinions on stress placement diverge sharply. Most native linguists, regardless of which dialect they speak, claim that stress falls on the first syllable. Between 1941 and 1975, several Western scholars proposed that the leftmost heavy syllable gets the stress. Yet other positions were taken in works published between 1835 and 1915.

Walker (1997) proposes that stress falls on the rightmost heavy syllable unless this syllable is word-final:

{|
| HˈHLL ||  ||  || 'to be organized'
|-
| LHˈHL ||  ||  || 'separating' (adverbial)
|-
| LHHˈHL ||  ||  || 'the residents of Ulaanbaatar'
|-
| HˈHH ||  ||  || 'angrily'
|-
| ˈHLH ||  ||  || 'sad'
|}

A "heavy syllable" is defined as one that is at least the length of a full vowel; short word-initial syllables are thereby excluded. If a word is bisyllabic and the only heavy syllable is word-final, it gets stressed anyway. In cases where there is only one phonemic short word-initial syllable, even this syllable can get the stress:

{|
| LˈH ||  ||  || 'goose'
|-
| ˈLL ||  ||  || 'having read'
|}

More recently, the most extensive collection of phonetic data so far in Mongolian studies has been applied to a partial account of stress placement in the closely related Chakhar dialect. The conclusion is drawn that di- and trisyllabic words with a short first syllable are stressed on the second syllable. But if their first syllable is long, then the data for different acoustic parameters seems to support conflicting conclusions: intensity data often seems to indicate that the first syllable is stressed, while F0 seems to indicate that it is the second syllable that is stressed.

Grammar 
The grammar in this article is also based primarily on Khalkha Mongolian. Unlike the phonology, most of what is said about morphology and syntax also holds true for Chakhar, while Khorchin is somewhat more diverse.

Morphology 
Modern Mongolian is an agglutinative—almost exclusively suffixing—language, with the only exception being reduplication. Mongolian also does not have gendered nouns, or definite articles like "the". Most of the suffixes consist of a single morpheme. There are many derivational morphemes. For example, the word  consists of the root  'to be', an epenthetic ‑‑, the causative ‑‑ (hence 'to find'), the derivative suffix ‑ that forms nouns created by the action (like -ation in organisation) and the complex suffix ‑ denoting something that belongs to the modified word (‑ would be genitive).

Nominal compounds are quite frequent. Some derivational verbal suffixes are rather productive, e.g.  'to speak',  'to speak with each other'. Formally, the independent words derived using verbal suffixes can roughly be divided into three classes: final verbs, which can only be used sentence-finally, i.e. ‑ (mainly future or generic statements) or ‑ (second person imperative); participles (often called "verbal nouns"), which can be used clause-finally or attributively, i.e. ‑ (perfect-past) or ‑ 'want to'; and converbs, which can link clauses or function adverbially, i.e. ‑ (qualifies for any adverbial function or neutrally connects two sentences) or ‑ (the action of the main clause takes place until the action expressed by the suffixed verb begins).

Nouns 
Roughly speaking, Mongolian has between seven and nine cases: nominative (unmarked), genitive, dative-locative, accusative, ablative, instrumental, comitative, privative and directive, though the final two are not always considered part of the case paradigm. If a direct object is definite, it must take the accusative, while it must take the nominative if it is indefinite. In addition to case, a number of postpositions exist that usually govern the genitive, dative-locative, comitative and privative cases, including a marked form of the nominative (which can itself then take further case forms). There is also a possible attributive case (when a noun is used attributively), which is unmarked in most nouns but takes the suffix ‑ (‑) when the stem has an unstable nasal. Nouns can also take a reflexive-possessive suffix, indicating that the marked noun is possessed by the subject of the sentence:  I friend- save- "I saved my friend". However, there are also somewhat noun-like adjectives to which case suffixes seemingly cannot be attached directly unless there is ellipsis.

{| class="wikitable"
|-
|+Mongolian noun cases
|-
! Case !! Suffix !! English preposition 
!Example (Cyrillic)!! Transliteration !! Translation
|-
| nominative || – || – 
|ном||  || book
|-
| accusative || ‑ (‑)‑ (‑), ‑ (‑) || – 
|  ||  || the book (as object)
|-
| genitive || ‑ (‑)‑ (‑), ‑ (‑)‑ (‑), ‑ (‑)‑ (‑)‑ (‑), ‑ (‑)‑ (‑), ‑ (‑) || of 
|  ||  || of (a) book; book's
|-
| dative-locative|| ‑ (‑)‑ (‑)‑ (‑), ‑ (‑), ‑ (‑), ‑ (‑)‑ (‑)‑ (‑)‑ (‑), ‑ (‑), ‑ (‑), ‑ (‑)‑ (‑) || on, to, at, in 
|  ||  || in (a) book
|-
| ablative || ‑ (‑), ‑ (‑), ‑ (‑), ‑ (‑)‑ (‑), ‑ (‑), ‑ (‑), ‑ (‑)‑ (‑), ‑ (‑), ‑ (‑), ‑ (‑) || from 
|  ||  || from (a) book
|-
| instrumental || ‑ (‑), ‑ (‑), ‑ (‑), ‑ (‑)‑ (‑), ‑ (‑), ‑ (‑), ‑ (‑) || with, using 
|  ||  || with (e.g. by means of a) book
|-
| comitative || ‑ (‑), ‑ (‑), ‑ (‑) || together with 
|  ||  || with (e.g. alongside a) book
|-
| privative || ‑ (‑) || without ||  ||  || without (a) book
|-
| directive ||  (),  () (),  () || towards ||  ||  || towards (a) book
|}

Note: the rules governing the morphology of Mongolian case endings are intricate, and so the rules given below are only indicative. In many situations, further (more general) rules must also be taken into account in order to produce the correct form: these include the presence of an unstable nasal or unstable velar, as well as the rules governing when a penultimate vowel should be deleted from the stem with certain case endings (e.g.  () →  ()). The additional morphological rules specific to loanwords are not covered.

Nominative case 
The nominative case is used when a noun (or other part of speech acting as one) is the subject of the sentence, and the agent of whatever action (not just physically) takes place in the sentence. In Mongolian, the nominative case does not have an ending.

Accusative case 
The accusative case is used when a noun acts as a direct object (or just “object”), and receives action from a transitive verb. It is formed by:
 ‑ (‑) after stems ending in long vowels or diphthongs, or when a stem ending in  () has an unstable velar (unstable g).
 ‑ (‑) after back vowel stems ending in unpalatalized consonants (except  and ), short vowels (except ) or iotated vowels.
 ‑ (‑) after front vowel stems ending in consonants, short vowels or iotated vowels; and after all stems ending in the palatalized consonants  (),  () and  (), as well as  (),  (),  () or  ().
Note: If the stem ends in a short vowel or  (), it is replaced by the suffix.

Genitive case 
The genitive case is used to show possession of something.

For regular stems, it is formed by:
 ‑ (‑) after stems ending in the diphthongs  (),  (),  (),  (),  () or  (), or the long vowel  ().
 ‑ (‑) after back vowel stems ending in  ().
 ‑ (‑) after front vowel stems ending in  ().
 ‑ (‑) after back vowel stems ending in unpalatalized consonants (except ,  and ), short vowels (except ) or iotated vowels.
 ‑ (‑) after front vowel stems ending in consonants (other than ), short vowels or iotated vowels; and after all stems ending in the palatalized consonants  (),  () and  (), as well as  (),  (),  () or  ().
 ‑ (‑) after stems ending in a long vowel (other than ), or after the diphthongs  (),  () or  ().
Note: If the stem ends in a short vowel or  (), it is replaced by the suffix.

For stems with an unstable nasal (unstable n), it is formed by:
 ‑ (‑) after back vowel stems ending in  () or  ().
 ‑ (‑) after front vowel stems ending in  () or  ().
Note: If the stem ends in  () or  (), it is replaced by the suffix.

For stems with an unstable velar (unstable g), it is formed by ‑ (‑).

Dative-locative case 
The dative-locative case is used to show the location of something, or to specify that something is in something else.

For regular stems or those with an unstable velar (unstable g), it is formed by:
 ‑ (‑) after stems ending in vowels or the vocalized consonants  (),  () and  (), and a small number of stems ending in  () and  ().
 ‑ (‑) after stems ending in  () and  (), most stems ending in  () and  (), and stems ending in  () when it is preceded by a vowel.
 ‑ (‑) after stems ending in the palatalized consonants  (),  () and  ().
 ‑ (‑), ‑ (‑), ‑ (‑) or ‑ (‑) after all other stems (depending on the vowel harmony of the stem).

For stems with an unstable nasal (unstable n), it is formed by:
 ‑ (‑) after stems ending in vowels.
 ‑ (‑) after stems ending in the palatalized consonants  (),  () and  ().
 ‑ (‑), ‑ (‑), ‑ (‑) or ‑ (‑) after all other stems (depending on the vowel harmony of the stem).

Plurals 
Source:

Plurality may be left unmarked, but there are overt plurality markers, some of which are restricted to humans. A noun that is modified by a numeral usually does not take any plural affix. There are four ways of forming plurals in Mongolian:

 Some plurals are formed by adding - -nuud or - -nüüd. If the last vowel of the previous word is a (a), o (y), or ɔ (o), then - is used; e.g.  harh 'rat' becomes  harhnuud 'rats'. If the last vowel of the previous word is e (э), ʊ (ө), ü (ү), or i (и) then  is used; e.g.  nüd 'eye' becomes  nüdnüüd 'eyes'.
 In other plurals, just - -uud or - -üüd is added without the "n"; e.g.  hot 'city' becomes  hotuud 'cities', and  eezh 'mother' becomes  eezhüüd 'mothers'.
 Another way of forming plurals is by adding - -nar; e.g.  bagsh 'teacher' becomes  bagsh nar 'teachers'. 
 The final way is an irregular form used:  hün 'person' becomes  hümüüs 'people'.

Pronouns 
Personal pronouns exist for the first and second person, while the old demonstrative pronouns have come to form third person (proximal and distal) pronouns. Other word (sub-)classes include interrogative pronouns, conjunctions (which take participles), spatials, and particles, the last being rather numerous.

Negation 
Negation is mostly expressed by -güi (-) after participles and by the negation particle bish after nouns and adjectives; negation particles preceding the verb (for example in converbal constructions) exist, but tend to be replaced by analytical constructions.

Numbers

Forming questions 
When asking questions in Mongolian, a question marker is used to show a question is being asked. There are different question markers for yes/no questions and for information questions.

 Yes/No Question Particles -
 Open Ended Question Particles -

Basic interrogative pronouns - ( 'what'), - ( 'where'),  ( 'who'),  ( 'why'),  ( 'how'),  ( 'when'),  ( 'what kind')

Verbs 
In Mongolian, verbs have a stem and an ending. These are the infinitive or dictionary forms. The final vowel is barely pronounced and is not pronounced at all if the word after begins with a vowel, so   is pronounced  'hello, how are you?'.

 Past Tense 
 Informed Past Tense (any point in past) 
 Informed Past Tense (not long ago) 
 Non-Informed Past Tense (generally a slightly to relatively more distant past) 
 Present Perfect Tense 
 Present Progressive Tense 
 (Reflective) Present Progressive Tense 
 Simple Present Tense 
 Simple Future 
 Infinitive 

Negative form 
There are several ways to form negatives in Mongolian. For example:

  – the negative form of the verb 'to be' –  means 'is/are not'.
 -. This suffix is added to verbs, so  ( 'go/will go') becomes  ( 'do not go/will not go').
  is the word for 'no'.
  is used for negative imperatives; e.g.  ( 'don't go')

Syntax

Differential case marking 
Mongolian uses differential case marking, being a regular Differential Object Marking (DOM) language. DOM emerges from a complicated interaction of factors such as referentiality, animacy and topicality.

Mongolian also exhibits a specific type of Differential Subject Marking (DSM), in which the subjects of embedded clauses (including adverbial clauses) occur with accusative case.

Phrase structure
The noun phrase has the order: demonstrative pronoun/numeral, adjective, noun. Attributive sentences precede the whole NP. Titles or occupations of people, low numerals indicating groups, and focus clitics are put behind the head noun. Possessive pronouns (in different forms) may either precede or follow the NP. Examples:

The verbal phrase consists of the predicate in the center, preceded by its complements and by the adverbials modifying it and followed (mainly if the predicate is sentence-final) by modal particles, as in the following example with predicate bichsen:

In this clause the adverbial, helehgüigeer 'without saying [so]' must precede the predicate's complement, üüniig 'it-' in order to avoid syntactic ambiguity, since helehgüigeer is itself derived from a verb and hence an üüniig preceding it could be construed as its complement. If the adverbial was an adjective such as hurdan 'fast', it could optionally immediately precede the predicate. There are also cases in which the adverb must immediately precede the predicate.

For Khalkha, the most complete treatment of the verbal forms is by Luvsanvandan (ed.) (1987). However, the analysis of predication presented here, while valid for Khalkha, is adapted from the description of Khorchin.

Most often, of course, the predicate consists of a verb. However, there are several types of nominal predicative constructions, with or without a copula. Auxiliaries that express direction and aktionsart (among other meanings) can with the assistance of a linking converb occupy the immediate postverbal position; e.g.

The next position is filled by converb suffixes in connection with the auxiliary, baj- 'to be', e.g.

Suffixes occupying this position express grammatical aspect; e.g. progressive and resultative. In the next position, participles followed by baj- may follow, e.g.,

Here, an explicit perfect and habituality can be marked, which is aspectual in meaning as well. This position may be occupied by multiple suffixes in a single predication, and it can still be followed by a converbal Progressive. The last position is occupied by suffixes that express tense, evidentiality, modality, and aspect.

Clauses
Unmarked phrase order is subject–object–predicate. While the predicate generally has to remain in clause-final position, the other phrases are free to change order or to wholly disappear. The topic tends to be placed clause-initially, new information rather at the end of the clause. Topic can be overtly marked with bol, which can also mark contrastive focus, overt additive focus ('even, also') can be marked with the clitic ch, and overt restrictive focus with the clitic l ('only').

The inventory of voices in Mongolian consists of passive, causative, reciprocal, plurative, and cooperative. In a passive sentence, the verb takes the suffix -gd- and the agent takes either dative or instrumental case, the first of which is more common. In the causative, the verb takes the suffix -uul-, the causee (the person caused to do something) in a transitive action (e.g. 'raise') takes dative or instrumental case, and the causee in an intransitive action (e.g. 'rise') takes accusative case. Causative morphology is also used in some passive contexts:

The semantic attribute of animacy is syntactically important: thus the sentence, 'the bread was eaten by me', which is acceptable in English, would not be acceptable in Mongolian. The reciprocal voice is marked by -ld-, the plurative by -cgaa-, and the cooperative by -lc-.

Mongolian allows for adjectival depictives that relate to either the subject or the direct object, e.g. Liena nücgen untdag 'Lena sleeps naked', while adjectival resultatives are marginal.

Complex sentences 
One way to conjoin clauses is to have the first clause end in a converb, as in the following example using the converb -bol:

Some verbal nouns in the dative (or less often in the instrumental) function very similar to converbs: e.g. replacing olbol in the preceding sentence with olohod find- yields 'when we find it we'll give it to you'. Quite often, postpositions govern complete clauses. In contrast, conjunctions take verbal nouns without case:

Finally, there is a class of particles, usually clause-initial, that are distinct from conjunctions but that also relate clauses:

Mongolian has a complementizer auxiliary verb ge- very similar to Japanese to iu. ge- literally means 'to say' and in converbal form gezh precedes either a psych verb or a verb of saying. As a verbal noun like gedeg (with ni) it can form a subset of complement clauses. As gene it may function as an evidentialis marker.

Mongolian clauses tend to be combined paratactically, which sometimes gives rise to sentence structures which are subordinative despite resembling coordinative structures in European languages:

In the subordinate clause the subject, if different from the subject of main clause, sometimes has to take accusative or genitive case. There is marginal occurrence of subjects taking ablative case as well. Subjects of attributive clauses in which the head has a function (as is the case for all English relative clauses) usually require that if the subject is not the head, then it take the genitive, e.g. tüünii idsen hool that.one- eat- meal 'the meal that s/he had eaten'.

Loanwords and coined words 
Mongolian first adopted loanwords from many languages including Old Turkic, Sanskrit (these often via Uyghur), Persian, Arabic, Tibetan, Tungusic, and Chinese. However, more recent loanwords come from Russian, English, and Mandarin Chinese (mainly in Inner Mongolia). Language commissions of the Mongolian state continuously translate new terminology into Mongolian, so as the Mongolian vocabulary now has  'president' ('generalizer') and  'beer' ('yellow kumys'). There are several loan translations, e.g.  'train' ('fire-having cart') from Chinese  ( 'fire cart') 'train'. Other loan translations include  'essence' from Chinese  ( 'true quality'),  'population' from Chinese  ( 'person mouth'),  'corn, maize' from Chinese  ( 'jade rice') and  'republic' from Chinese  ( 'public collaboration nation').

In the 20th century, many Russian loanwords entered the Mongolian language, including  'doctor',  'chocolate',  'train wagon',  'calendar',  'system',  (from  'T-shirt'), and  'car'.

In more recent times, due to socio-political reforms, Mongolian has loaned various words from English; some of which have gradually evolved as official terms:  'management',  'computer',  'file',  'marketing',  'credit',  'online', and  'message'. Most of these are confined to the Mongolian state.

Other languages have borrowed words from Mongolian. Examples (Mongolian in brackets) include Persian کشيكچى  (from  'royal guard'),   (from  'pheasant'),   (from  'iron armour'),   (from  'chief of commandant'),   (from  'scissors'); Uzbek  (from  'island'); Chinese 衚衕 hutong (from  'passageway'), 站赤 zhanchi (from  'courier/post station'); Middle Chinese 犢 duk (from  'calf'); Korean   (from  'royal meal'),   (from  'castrated animal'),   (from  'chest of an animal'); Old English cocer (from  'container'); Old French quivre (from  'container'); Old High German Baldrian (from  'valerian plant'). Köküür and balchirgan-a are thought to have been brought to Europe by the Huns or Pannonian Avars.

Despite having a diverse range of loanwords, Mongolian dialects such as Khalkha and Khorchin, within a comparative vocabulary of 452 words of Common Mongolic vocabulary, retain as many as 95% of these native words, contrasting e.g. with Southern Mongolic languages at 39–77% retentions.

Writing systems 

Mongolian has been written in a variety of alphabets, making it a language with one of the largest number of scripts used historically. The earliest stages of Mongolian (Xianbei, Wuhuan languages) may have used an indigenous runic script as indicated by Chinese sources. The Khitan large script adopted in 920 CE is an early Mongol (or according to some, para-Mongolic) script.

The traditional Mongolian script was first adopted by Temüjin in 1204, who recognized the need to represent his own people's language. It developed from the Uyghur script when several members of the Uyghur elite who were brought into the Mongol confederation early on shared their knowledge of their written language with the Mongol imperial clan. Among the Uyghurs sharing that knowledge were Tata-tonga, Bilge Buqa (比俚伽普華), Kara Igach Buyruk (哈剌亦哈赤北魯), and Mengsus (孟速思). From that time, the script underwent some minor disambiguations and supplementation.

Between 1930 and 1932, a short-lived attempt was made to introduce the Latin script in the Mongolian state. In 1941, the Latin alphabet was adopted, though it lasted only two months.

The Mongolian Cyrillic script was the result of the spreading of Russian influence following the expansion of Russian Empire. The establishment of Soviet Union helped the influence continue, and the Cyrillic alphabet was slowly introduced with the effort by Russian/Soviet linguists in collaboration with their Mongolian counterparts. It was made mandatory by government decree in 1941. It has been argued that the introduction of the Cyrillic script, with its smaller discrepancy between written and spoken form, contributed to the success of the large-scale government literacy campaign, which increased the literacy rate from 17.3% to 73.5% between 1941 and 1950. Earlier government campaigns to eradicate illiteracy, employing the traditional script, had only managed to raise literacy from 3.0% to 17.3% between 1921 and 1940. From 1991 to 1994, an attempt at reintroducing the traditional alphabet failed in the face of popular resistance. In informal contexts of electronic text production, the use of the Latin alphabet is common.

In the People's Republic of China, Mongolian is the official language along with Mandarin Chinese in some regions, notably the entire Inner Mongolia Autonomous Region. The traditional alphabet has always been used there, although Cyrillic was considered briefly before the Sino-Soviet split. There are two types of written Mongolian used in China: the traditional Mongolian script, which is official among Mongols nationwide, and the Clear Script, used predominantly among Oirats in Xinjiang.

In March 2020, the Mongolian government announced plans to use both Cyrillic and the traditional Mongolian script in official documents by 2025.

Linguistic history 

The Mongolian-Armenian wordlist of 55 words compiled by Kirakos of Gandzak (13th century) is the first written record of Mongolian words. From the 13th to the 15th centuries, Mongolian language texts were written in four scripts (not counting some vocabulary written in Western scripts): Uyghur Mongolian (UM) script (an adaptation of the Uyghur alphabet), 'Phags-pa script (Ph) (used in decrees), Chinese (SM) (The Secret History of the Mongols), and Arabic (AM) (used in dictionaries). While they are the earliest texts available, these texts have come to be called "Middle Mongol" in scholarly practice. The documents in UM script show some distinct linguistic characteristics and are therefore often distinguished by terming their language "Preclassical Mongolian".

The Yuan dynasty referred to the Mongolian language in Chinese as "Guoyu", which means "National language", a term also used by other non-Han dynasties to refer to their languages such as the Manchu language during the Qing dynasty, the Jurchen language during the Jin dynasty (1115–1234), the Khitan language during the Liao dynasty, and the Xianbei language during the Northern Wei period.

The next distinct period is Classical Mongolian, which is dated from the 17th to the 19th century. This is a written language with a high degree of standardization in orthography and syntax that sets it quite apart from the subsequent Modern Mongolian. The most notable documents in this language are the Mongolian Kangyur and Tengyur as well as several chronicles. In 1686, the Soyombo alphabet (Buddhist texts) was created, giving distinctive evidence on early classical Mongolian phonological peculiarities.

Changes in phonology

Consonants
Research into reconstruction of the consonants of Middle Mongol has engendered several controversies. Middle Mongol had two series of plosives, but there is disagreement as to which phonological dimension they lie on, whether aspiration or voicing. The early scripts have distinct letters for velar plosives and uvular plosives, but as these are in complementary distribution according to vowel harmony class, only two back plosive phonemes, */k/, * (~ *[k], *) are to be reconstructed. One prominent, long-running disagreement concerns certain correspondences of word medial consonants among the four major scripts (UM, SM, AM, and Ph, which were discussed in the preceding section). Word-medial /k/ of Uyghur Mongolian (UM) has not one, but two correspondences with the three other scripts: either /k/ or zero. Traditional scholarship has reconstructed */k/ for both correspondences, arguing that */k/ was lost in some instances, which raises the question of what the conditioning factors of those instances were. More recently, the other possibility has been assumed; namely, that the correspondence between UM /k/ and zero in the other scripts points to a distinct phoneme, /h/, which would correspond to the word-initial phoneme /h/ that is present in those other scripts. /h/ (also called /x/) is sometimes assumed to derive from *, which would also explain zero in SM, AM, Ph in some instances where UM indicates /p/; e.g. debel > Khalkha deel.

Preclassical Mongolian kündü, reconstructed as  'heavy', became Modern Mongolian  (but in the vicinity of Bayankhongor and Baruun-Urt, many speakers will say ). Originally word-final *n turned into /ŋ/; if * was originally followed by a vowel that later dropped, it remained unchanged, e.g.  became , but  became . After i-breaking,  became phonemic. In some words, word-final  was dropped with most case forms, but still appears with the ablative, dative and genitive.

Only foreign origin words start with the letter L and none start with the letter R.

Vowels
The standard view is that Proto-Mongolic had . VhV and VjV sequences where the second vowel was any vowel but  were monophthongized. In noninitial syllables, short vowels were deleted from the phonetic representation of the word and long vowels became short; e.g.

This reconstruction has recently been opposed, arguing that vowel developments across the Mongolic languages can be more economically explained starting from basically the same vowel system as Khalkha, only with  instead of *[e]. Moreover, the sound changes involved in this alternative scenario are more likely from an articulatory point of view and early Middle Mongol loans into Korean.

Changes in morphology

Nominal system

In the following discussion, in accordance with a preceding observation, the term "Middle Mongol" is used merely as a cover term for texts written in any of three scripts, Uighur Mongolian script (UM), Chinese (SM), or Arabic (AM).

The case system of Middle Mongol has remained mostly intact down to the present, although important changes occurred with the comitative and the dative and most other case suffixes did undergo slight changes in form, i.e., were shortened. The Middle Mongol comitative -luγ-a could not be used attributively, but it was replaced by the suffix -taj that originally derived adjectives denoting possession from nouns, e.g. mori-tai 'having a horse' became mor'toj 'having a horse/with a horse'. As this adjective functioned parallel to ügej 'not having', it has been suggested that a "privative case" ('without') has been introduced into Mongolian. There have been three different case suffixes in the dative-locative-directive domain that are grouped in different ways: -a as locative and -dur, -da as dative or -da and -a as dative and -dur as locative, in both cases with some functional overlapping. As -dur seems to be grammaticalized from dotur-a 'within', thus indicating a span of time, the second account seems to be more likely. Of these, -da was lost, -dur was first reduced to -du and then to -d and -a only survived in a few frozen environments. Finally, the directive of modern Mongolian, -ruu, has been innovated from uruγu 'downwards'. Social gender agreement was abandoned.

Verbal system
Middle Mongol had a slightly larger set of declarative finite verb suffix forms and a smaller number of participles, which were less likely to be used as finite predicates. The linking converb -n became confined to stable verb combinations, while the number of converbs increased. The distinction between male, female and plural subjects exhibited by some finite verbal suffixes was lost.

Changes in syntax
Neutral word order in clauses with pronominal subject changed from object–predicate–subject to subject–object–predicate; e.g.

The syntax of verb negation shifted from negation particles preceding final verbs to a negation particle following participles; thus, as final verbs could no longer be negated, their paradigm of negation was filled by particles. For example, Preclassical Mongolian ese irebe 'did not come' v. modern spoken Khalkha Mongolian ireegüi or irsengüi.

Example text 
Article 1 of the Universal Declaration of Human Rights in Mongolian, written in the Cyrillic alphabet:
Хүн бүр төрж мэндлэхэд эрх чөлөөтэй, адилхан нэр төртэй, ижил эрхтэй байдаг. Оюун ухаан, нандин чанар заяасан хүн гэгч өөр хоорондоо ахан дүүгийн үзэл санаагаар харьцах учиртай.

Article 1 of the Universal Declaration of Human Rights in Mongolian, written in the Mongolian Latin alphabet:
Hün bür törzh mendlehed erh chölöötei, adilhan ner törtei, izhil erhtei baidag. Oyuun uhaan nandin chanar zayaasan hün gegch öör hoorondoo ahan düügiin üzel sanaagaar haricah uchirtai.

Article 1 of the Universal Declaration of Human Rights in Mongolian, written in the Mongolian script:

   

Article 1 of the Universal Declaration of Human Rights in English:
All human beings are born free and equal in dignity and rights. They are endowed with reason and conscience and should act towards one another in a spirit of brotherhood.

See also 

 Mongolian writing systems
Mongolian script
Galik alphabet
Todo alphabet
ʼPhags-pa script
Horizontal square script
Soyombo script
Mongolian Latin alphabet
SASM/GNC romanization § Mongolian
Mongolian Cyrillic alphabet
Mongolian transliteration of Chinese characters

Mongolian Braille
 Mongolian Sign Language
 Mongolian name

Notes

References

Citations

Sources 
For some Mongolian authors, the Mongolian version of their name is also given in square brackets, e.g., "Harnud [Köke]". Köke is the author's native name. It is a practice common among Mongolian scholars, for purposes of publishing and being cited abroad, to adopt a surname based on one's patronymic, in this example "Harnud"; compare Mongolian name.
Some library catalogs write Chinese language titles with each syllable separate, even syllables belonging to a single word.

 List of abbreviations used
TULIP is in official use by some librarians; the remainder have been contrived for this listing.
 Journals
 KULIP = Kyūshū daigaku gengogaku ronshū [Kyushu University linguistics papers]
 MKDKH = Muroran kōgyō daigaku kenkyū hōkoku [Memoirs of the Muroran Institute of Technology]
 TULIP = Tōkyō daigaku gengogaku ronshū [Tokyo University linguistics papers]
 Publishers
 ÖMAKQ = Öbür mongγul-un arad-un keblel-ün qoriy-a 
 ÖMSKKQ = Öbür mongγul-un surγan kümüǰil-ün keblel-ün qoriy-a 
 ÖMYSKQ = Öbür mongγul-un yeke surγaγuli-yin keblel-ün qoriy-a 
 ŠUA = [Mongol Ulsyn] Šinžleh Uhaany Akademi 

  Amaržargal, B. 1988. BNMAU dah' Mongol helnij nutgijn ajalguuny tol' bichig: halh ajalguu. Ulaanbaatar: ŠUA.
 Apatóczky, Ákos Bertalan. 2005. On the problem of the subject markers of the Mongolian language. In Wú Xīnyīng, Chén Gānglóng (eds.), Miànxiàng xīn shìjìde ménggǔxué [The Mongolian studies in the new century : review and prospect]. Běijīng: Mínzú Chūbǎnshè. 334–343. .
 Ashimura, Takashi. 2002. Mongorugo jarōto gengo no  no yōhō ni tsuite. TULIP, 21: 147–200.
 Bajansan, Ž. and Š. Odontör. 1995. Hel šinžlelijn ner tom"joony züjlčilsen tajlbar toli. Ulaanbaatar.
 Bayančoγtu. 2002. Qorčin aman ayalγun-u sudulul. Kökeqota: ÖMYSKQ. .
 Bjambasan, P. 2001. Mongol helnij ügüjsgeh har'caa ilerhijleh hereglüürüüd. Mongol hel, sojolijn surguul: Erdem šinžilgeenij bičig, 18: 9–20.
 Bosson, James E. 1964. Modern Mongolian; a primer and reader. Uralic and Altaic series; 38. Bloomington: Indiana University.
 Brosig, Benjamin. 2009. Depictives and resultatives in Modern Khalkh Mongolian. Hokkaidō gengo bunka kenkyū, 7: 71–101.
 Chuluu, Ujiyediin. 1998. Studies on Mongolian verb morphology . Dissertation, University of Toronto.
 Činggeltei. 1999. Odu üj-e-jin mongγul kelen-ü ǰüi. Kökeqota: ÖMAKQ. .
 Coloo, Ž. 1988. BNMAU dah' mongol helnij nutgijn ajalguuny tol' bichig: ojrd ajalguu. Ulaanbaatar: ŠUA.
 Djahukyan, Gevork. (1991). Armenian Lexicography. In Franz Josef Hausmann (Ed.), An International Encyclopedia of Lexicography (pp. 2367–2371). Berlin: Walter de Gruyter.
 [Dobu] Dàobù. 1983. Ménggǔyǔ jiǎnzhì. Běijīng: Mínzú.
 Garudi. 2002. Dumdadu üy-e-yin mongγul kelen-ü bütüče-yin kelberi-yin sudulul. Kökeqota: ÖMAKQ.
 Georg, Stefan, Peter A. Michalove, Alexis Manaster Ramer, Paul J. Sidwell. 1999. Telling general linguists about Altaic. Journal of Linguistics, 35: 65–98.
 Guntsetseg, D. 2008. Differential Object Marking in Mongolian. Working Papers of the SFB 732 Incremental Specification in Context, 1: 53–69.
 Hammar, Lucia B. 1983. Syntactic and pragmatic options in Mongolian – a study of bol and n'. Ph.D. Thesis. Bloomington: Indiana University.
 [Köke] Harnud, Huhe. 2003. A Basic Study of Mongolian Prosody. Helsinki: Publications of the Department of Phonetics, University of Helsinki. Series A; 45. Dissertation. .
 Hashimoto, Kunihiko. 1993. <-san> no imiron. MKDKH, 43: 49–94. Sapporo: Dō daigaku.
 Hashimoto, Kunihiko. 2004. Mongorugo no kopyura kōbun no imi no ruikei. Muroran kōdai kiyō, 54: 91–100.
 Janhunen, Juha (ed.). 2003. The Mongolic languages. London: Routledge. 
 Janhunen, Juha. 2003a. Written Mongol. In Janhunen 2003: 30–56.
 Janhunen, Juha. 2003b. Para-Mongolic. In Janhunen 2003: 391–402.
 Janhunen, Juha. 2003c. Proto-Mongolic. In Janhunen 2003: 1–29.
 Janhunen, Juha. 2003d. Mongol dialects. In Janhunen 2003: 177–191.
 Janhunen, Juha. 2006. Mongolic languages. In K. Brown (ed.), The encyclopedia of language & linguistics. Amsterdam: Elsevier: 231–234.
 Johanson, Lars. 1995. On Turkic Converb Clauses. In Martin Haspelmath and Ekkehard König (eds.), Converbs in cross-linguistic perspective. Berlin: Mouton de Gruyter: 313–347. .
 Kang, Sin Hyen. 2000. Tay.mong.kol.e chem.sa č-uy uy.mi.wa ki.nung. Monggolhak [Mongolian Studies], 10: 1–23. Seoul: Hanʼguk Monggol Hakhoe [Korean Association for Mongolian Studies].
 Karlsson, Anastasia Mukhanova. 2005. Rhythm and intonation in Halh Mongolian. Ph.D. Thesis. Lund: Lund University. Series: Travaux de l'Institut de Linguistique de Lund; 46. Lund: Lund University. .
 Ko, Seongyeon. 2011. Vowel Contrast and Vowel Harmony Shift in the Mongolic Languages. Language Research, 47.1: 23–43.
 Luvsanvandan, Š. 1959. Mongol hel ajalguuny učir. Studia Mongolica [Mongolyn sudlal], 1.
 Luvsanvandan, Š. (ed.). 1987. (Authors: P. Bjambasan, C. Önörbajan, B. Pürev-Očir, Ž. Sanžaa, C. Žančivdorž) Orčin cagijn mongol helnij ügzüjn bajguulalt. Ulaanbaatar: Ardyn bolovsrolyn jaamny surah bičig, setgüülijn negdsen rjedakcijn gazar.
 Matsuoka, Yūta. 2007. Gendai mongorugo no asupekuto to dōshi no genkaisei. KULIP, 28: 39–68.
 Mizuno, Masanori. 1995. Gendai mongorugo no jūzokusetsushugo ni okeru kakusentaku. TULIP, 14: 667–680.
 Mönh-Amgalan, J. 1998. Orčin tsagijn mongol helnij bajmžijn aj. Ulaanbaatar: Moncame. .
 Nadmid, Ž. 1967. Mongol hel, tüünij bičgijn tüühen högžlijn tovč tojm. Ulaanbaatar: ŠUA.
 Norčin et al. (eds.) 1999. Mongγol kelen-ü toli. Kökeqota: ÖMAKQ. .
 Okada, Hidehiro. 1984. Mongol chronicles and Chinggisid genealogies . Journal of Asian and African studies, 27: 147–154.
 Öbür mongγul-un yeke surγaγuli. 2005 [1964]. Odu üy-e-yin mongγul kele. Kökeqota: ÖMAKQ. .
 Poppe, Nicholas. 1955. Introduction to Mongolian comparative studies. Helsinki: Finno-Ugrian Society.
 Poppe, Nicholas. 1970. Mongolian language handbook. Washington D.C.: Center for Applied Linguistics.
 Pürev-Očir, B. 1997. Orčin cagijn mongol helnij ögüülberzüj. Ulaanbaatar: n.a.
 Rachewiltz, Igor de. 1976. Some Remarks on the Stele of Yisuüngge. In Walter Heissig et al., Tractata Altaica – Denis Sinor, sexagenario optime de rebus altaicis merito dedicata. Wiesbaden: Harrassowitz. pp. 487–508.
 Rachewiltz, Igor de. 1999. Some reflections on so-called Written Mongolian. In: Helmut Eimer, Michael Hahn, Maria Schetelich, Peter Wyzlic (eds.). Studia Tibetica et Mongolica – Festschrift Manfred Taube. Swisttal-Odendorf: Indica et Tibetica Verlag: 235–246.
 Rinchen, Byambyn (ed.). 1979. Mongol ard ulsyn ugsaatny sudlal helnij šinžlelijn atlas. Ulaanbaatar: ŠUA.
 Rybatzki, Volker. 2003a. Intra-Mongolic Taxonomy. In Janhunen 2003: 364–390.
 Rybatzki, Volker. 2003b. Middle Mongol. In Janhunen 2003: 47–82.
 Sajto, Kosüke. 1999. Orčin čagyn mongol helnij "neršsen" temdeg nerijn onclog (temdeglel). Mongol ulsyn ih surguulijn Mongol sudlalyn surguul' Erdem šinžilgeenij bičig XV bot', 13: 95–111.
 Sanžaa, Ž. and D. Tujaa. 2001. Darhad ajalguuny urt egšgijg avialbaryn tövšind sudalsan n'. Mongol hel šinžlel, 4: 33–50.
 Sanžeev, G. D. 1953. Sravnitel'naja grammatika mongol'skih jazykov. Moskva: Akademija Nauk USSR.
 Sečen. 2004. Odu üy-e-yin mongγul bičig-ün kelen-ü üge bütügekü daγaburi-yin sudulul. Kökeqota: ÖMASKKQ. .
 Sechenbaatar [Sečenbaγatur], Borjigin. 2003. The Chakhar dialect of Mongol: a morphological description. Helsinki: Finno-Ugrian society. .
 Sečenbaγatur, Qasgerel, Tuyaγ-a [Туяa], Bu. Jirannige, Wu Yingzhe, Činggeltei. 2005. Mongγul kelen-ü nutuγ-un ayalγun-u sinǰilel-ün uduridqal [A guide to the regional dialects of Mongolian]. Kökeqota: ÖMAKQ. .
 Siqinchaoketu [=Sečenčoγtu]. 1999). Kangjiayu yanjiu. Shanghai: Shanghai Yuandong Chubanshe.
 Slater, Keith. 2003. A grammar of Mangghuer. London: RoutledgeCurzon. .
 Starostin, Sergei A., Anna V. Dybo, and Oleg A. Mudrak. 2003. Etymological Dictionary of the Altaic Languages, 3 volumes. Leiden: Brill. .
 Street, John C. 1957. The language of the Secret History of the Mongols. New Haven: American Oriental Society. American Oriental series; 42.
 Street, John C. 2008. Middle Mongolian Past-tense -BA in the Secret History. Journal of the American Oriental Society 128 (3): 399–422.
 Svantesson, Jan-Olof. 2003. Khalkha. In Janhunen 2003: 154–176.
 Svantesson, Jan-Olof, Anna Tsendina, Anastasia Karlsson, Vivan Franzén. 2005. The Phonology of Mongolian. New York: Oxford University Press. .
  Temürcereng, J̌. 2004. Mongγul kelen-ü üge-yin sang-un sudulul. Kökeqota: ÖMASKKQ. .
  Toγtambayar, L. 2006. Mongγul kelen-ü kele ǰüiǰigsen yabuča-yin tuqai sudulul. Liyuuning-un ündüsüten-ü keblel-ün qoriy-a. .
  Tömörtogoo, D. 1992. Mongol helnij tüühen helzüj. Ulaanbaatar.
  Tömörtogoo, D. 2002. Mongol dörvölžin üsegijn durashalyn sudalgaa. Ulaanbaatar: IAMS. .
  Tsedendamba, Ts. and Sürengiin Möömöö (eds.). 1997. Orčin cagijn mongol hel. Ulaanbaatar.
 Tserenpil, D. and R. Kullmann. 2005. Mongolian grammar. Ulaanbaatar: Admon. .
  Tümenčečeg. 1990. Dumdadu ǰaγun-u mongγul kelen-ü toγačin ögülekü tölüb-ün kelberi-nügüd ba tegün-ü ularil kögǰil. Öbür mongγul-un yeke surγaγuli, 3: 102–120.
 
 Walker, Rachel. 1997. Mongolian stress, licensing, and factorial typology . Rutgers Optimality Archive, ROA-172.
  Weiers, Michael. 1969. Untersuchungen zu einer historischen Grammatik des präklassischen Schriftmongolisch. Wiesbaden: Otto Harrassowitz. Asiatische Forschungen, 28. (Revision of 1966 dissertation submitted to the Universität Bonn.)
 Yu, Wonsoo. 1991. A study of Mongolian negation (Ph.D. thesis). Bloomington: Indiana University.

Further reading 
 Janhunen, Juha A. (2012): Mongolian. (London Oriental and African Language Library, 19.) Amsterdam: John Benjamins Publishing Company. . 

Traditional Mongolian script
 (ru) Schmidt, Isaak Jakob, Грамматика монгольскaго языка (Grammatika mongolʹskago i︠a︡zyka), Saint-Petersburg, 1832
 (ru) Bobrovnikov, Aleksieĭ Aleksandrovich Грамматика монгольско-калмыцкого языка (Grammatika mongolʹsko-kalmyt͡skago i͡azyka), Kazan, 1849
 (de) Schmidt, Isaak Jakob, Grammatik der mongolischen Sprache, St. Petersburg, 1831
 (fr) Rémusat, Abel Récherches sur les langues tartares, Paris, 1820
 (fr, ru) Kovalevskiĭ, Osip Mikhaĭlovich, Dictionnaire Mongol-Russe-Franca̧is, Volumes 1-3, Kazan 1844-46-49
 (fr) Soulié, Charles Georges, Éléments de grammaire mongole (dialecte ordoss), Paris, 1903
 (it) Puini, Carlo, Elementi della grammatica mongolica, Firenze, 1878

External links 

 Lingua Mongolia (a website dedicated to the Mongolian language, mostly as written in the Mongolian Uyghur script) 
 Bolor Mongolian-English dictionary

 
Agglutinative languages
Central Mongolic languages
Languages of Mongolia
Languages of Russia
Articles containing Mongolian script text
Subject–object–verb languages
Articles containing video clips
Languages attested from the 13th century
Languages with own distinct writing systems
Languages written in Cyrillic script